Elena Roca (Born 9 March 1991, in Jujuy) is an Argentine model. She was crowned Belleza Argentina 2016 but dethroned her title.

Life 
She has a degree in Journalistic Communication from the UCA, Universidad Catolica Argentina, Argentine and was an international model in China and beauty pageant titleholder.

She had a loving relation with Santiago Moreno Charpentier (better well-known like "Chano"), the ex- singer of the Tan Biónica band and present singer soloist.

References

Argentine beauty pageant winners
Living people
1995 births